Sympetalandra schmutzii is a species of legume in the family Fabaceae. It is found only on Flores in Indonesia.

References

Caesalpinioideae
Flora of the Lesser Sunda Islands
Vulnerable plants
Taxonomy articles created by Polbot